Cândești is a commune in Dâmbovița County, Muntenia, Romania. It is composed of five villages: Aninoșani, Cândești-Deal, Cândești-Vale (the commune center), Dragodănești and Valea Mare.

It lies on the right bank of the Dâmbovița River. Its neighbors are Voinești commune to the north and to the east, Tătărani commune to the south, and Boțești, Argeș commune to the west.

References

Communes in Dâmbovița County
Localities in Muntenia